Qualifying for the UEFA Euro 2008 finals tournament took place between August 2006 and November 2007. Fifty teams were divided into seven groups. In a double round-robin system, each team played against each of the others in their group on a home-and-away basis. The winner and runner-up of each group qualified automatically for the final tournament. This was the first Euro qualification since expansion to have no playoff.

Austria and Switzerland qualified automatically as co-hosts of the event.

Qualified teams

{| class="wikitable sortable"
|-
! Team
! Qualified as
! Qualified on
! data-sort-type="number"|Previous appearances in tournament
|-
|  ||  ||  || 0 (debut)
|-
|  ||  ||  || 2 (1996, 2004)
|-
|  ||  ||  || 9 (1972, 1976, 1980, 1984, 1988, 1992, 1996, 2000, 2004)
|-
|  ||  ||  || 2 (1980, 2004)
|-
|  ||  ||  || 6 (1960, 1976, 1980, 1996, 2000, 2004)
|-
|  ||  ||  || 3 (1984, 1996, 2000)
|-
|  ||  ||  || 0 (debut)
|-
|  ||  ||  || 6 (1968, 1980, 1988, 1996, 2000, 2004)
|-
|  ||  ||  || 6 (1960, 1984, 1992, 1996, 2000, 2004)
|-
|  ||  ||  || 2 (1996, 2004)
|-
|  ||  ||  || 7 (1964, 1980, 1984, 1988, 1996, 2000, 2004)
|-
|  ||  ||  || 7 (1976, 1980, 1988, 1992, 1996, 2000, 2004)
|-
|  ||  ||  || 4 (1984, 1996, 2000, 2004)
|-
|  ||  ||  || 2 (1996, 2000)
|-
|  ||  ||  || 8 (1960, 1964, 1968, 1972, 1988, 1992, 1996, 2004)
|-
|  ||  ||  || 3 (1992, 2000, 2004)
|}

Seedings
UEFA used the 2005 UEFA national team coefficient to rank the teams according to their results in both UEFA Euro 2004 and 2006 FIFA World Cup qualification. Only the group matches counted towards the coefficients. As defending champions, Greece were automatically seeded in the top pool. Since Portugal hosted and automatically qualified for UEFA Euro 2004, the coefficient factored in only their 2006 FIFA World Cup qualification record. Similarly, Germany's coefficient factored only their UEFA Euro 2004 qualifying record, since they hosted and automatically qualified for the 2006 FIFA World Cup. Meanwhile, Kazakhstan never competed in the European Championships previously, so the coefficient used only their World Cup record. Montenegro had not been admitted to UEFA/FIFA at the time the qualifying competition had started, and thus were ineligible.

The draw took place on 27 January 2006 in Montreux, Switzerland. 

Austria (1,333) and Switzerland (1,833) were already assured of places at Euro 2008 as host nations.

Teams in bold eventually qualified for the final tournament.

Tiebreakers
If two or more teams were equal on points on completion of the group matches, the following criteria were applied to determine the rankings:
 Higher number of points obtained in the group matches played among the teams in question
 Superior goal difference from the group matches played among the teams in question
 Higher number of goals scored in the group matches played among the teams in question
 Higher number of goals scored away from home in the group matches played among the teams in question
 If, after applying criteria 1) to 4) to several teams, two or more teams still had an equal ranking, the criteria 1) to 4) was reapplied to determine the ranking of these teams. If this procedure did not lead to a decision, criteria 6) and 7) applied;
 Results of all group matches: 1. Superior goal difference 2. Higher number of goals scored 3. Higher number of goals scored away from home 4. Fair play conduct
 Drawing of lots

Summary

Groups
The qualifying process started in August 2006. Austria and Switzerland were automatically granted places in the tournament finals as the host nations.

The qualifying format had been changed from the previous tournament: the respective winners and runners-up from seven groups would automatically qualify for the finals, alongside the host nations. Therefore, there were no play-offs between the runners-up of the groups. Group A contained eight teams, while the other six groups each contained seven.

As the official successor of the previous football association, Serbia inherited the position originally allotted to Serbia and Montenegro in Group A prior to the dissolution of the state union. Montenegro were granted UEFA membership after qualifying had started and thus were not able to participate in this European Championship.

Group A

Group B

Group C

Group D

Group E

Group F

Group G

Goalscorers

Notes

References

External links

 UEFA Euro 2008 at UEFA.com

 
Qualifying

2008
UEFA Euro 2008